Cristieana Cojocaru (later Matei, born 2 January 1962) is a retired Romanian runner who specialized in the 400 m hurdles and flat 800 m events. She won a bronze medal in the hurdles at the 1984 Olympics. In the 800 m she won the 1985 world indoor title and three medals at the European indoor championships in 1984–1986.

References

External links 
 
 
 

1962 births
Living people
People from Mehedinți County
Romanian female hurdlers
Romanian female middle-distance runners
Olympic female hurdlers
Olympic athletes of Romania
Olympic bronze medalists for Romania
Olympic bronze medalists in athletics (track and field)
Athletes (track and field) at the 1984 Summer Olympics
Medalists at the 1984 Summer Olympics
Universiade medalists in athletics (track and field)
Universiade silver medalists for Romania
Medalists at the 1985 Summer Universiade
Goodwill Games medalists in athletics
Competitors at the 1986 Goodwill Games
World Athletics Indoor Championships winners
Japan Championships in Athletics winners
USA Outdoor Track and Field Championships winners